Tori is a small borough in Tori Parish, Pärnu County, Estonia. Prior to the administrative reform of Estonian local governments in 2017, it was the administrative centre of Tori Parish, replaced by the town of Sindi.

Tori had a station on the Tallinn - Pärnu railway line operated by Elron, located in nearby Selja village. This closed in December 2018.

References

External links
Tori Parish 

Boroughs and small boroughs in Estonia
Kreis Pernau